Hypatima binummulata is a moth in the family Gelechiidae. It was described by Edward Meyrick in 1929. It is found in KwaZulu-Natal, South Africa.

References

Endemic moths of South Africa
Hypatima
Taxa named by Edward Meyrick
Moths described in 1929